Bozgodar may refer to:
 Bozgodar-e Olya
 Bozgodar-e Sofla